Glyptogona duriuscula, is a species of spider of the genus Glyptogona. It is endemic to Sri Lanka.

See also 
 List of Araneidae species

References

Araneidae
Endemic fauna of Sri Lanka
Spiders of Asia
Spiders described in 1895